The Potato Germans (Kartoffeltyskere) were a group of German families who settled in the heathlands of central Jutland in Denmark during the mid-1700s. The term is sometimes also extended to their descendants.

History
The German immigrants moved to central Jutland when King Frederick V of Denmark promised 20 years of tax freedom, soil, livestock, money, and freedom from military service, for anyone who would cultivate the Jutlandic heaths. The settlers were mostly from Hesse and the Palatinate in modern-day Germany as well as from Austria. Men, women, and children included, 965 individuals spread across 265 families first arrived between 1759 and 1763.

The majority settled on Alheden in the southernmost part of Fjends and the northernmost part of Lysgård in central Jutland. This comprises the site of the towns of Frederiks, Grønhøj, Havredal, and Karup. Much of this land was difficult to cultivate because of how much heather the soil contained, but after it was burned the area became better suited for the cultivation of potatoes.

The situation was difficult for the families. Many of settlers were craftsmen with little knowledge of farming. Most of the settlers subsequently left, with many moving back to Germany, but 59 of the families stayed on Alheden for more than a year.

Surnames
The Potato German settlers introduced a number of new surnames to Denmark. Though still rare in the country as a whole, many people living near Alheden still carry these surnames. 

Agricola
Betzer, Bitsch, Bräuner, Bärthel
Cramer
Dickes, Dürr
Frank
Gantzhorn
Harritz, Herbel-Schmidt, Hermann, Herold
Jung
Keller
Krath, Kriegbaum
Lajer, Lauth
Marcher, Marquard, Maul, Morratz
Philbert
Rost
Schönheider (also spelled Schønheider)
Wacher, Wendel, Winkler, Woller, Würtz

See also

North Schleswig Germans

References

Bibliography
Valdemar Andersen (1970) Den jyske hedekolonisation (Aarhus: Universitetsforlaget. Skrifter udgivet af Jysk Selskab for Historie, Number 24)

External links
 "Bemærkninger over Alheden og dens Colonier, af Fr. C. Carstens, Præst paa Colonien. Viborg, 1839. 137 S. 8." (Historisk Tidsskrift, 1. række, Bind 1; 1840)
 Ejlif Bøgebjerg: "Den danske Regering og de tyske Kolonisters Indkaldelse 1759—65" (Historie/Jyske Samlinger, 5. række, Bind 1; 1932)
 P. M. Rørsig: "Fra Alhedens første Kolonisation" (Historie/Jyske Samlinger, 4. række, Bind 5; 1925)
 Fridlev Skrubbeltrang (anmeldelse af): "Valdemar Andersen: Den jyske hedekolonisation. Skrifter udgivet af Jysk Selskab for Historie 24. Universitetsforlaget i Århus, 1970" (Historisk Tidsskrift, 12. række, Bind 5; 1971)

German emigrants to Denmark
1759 in Denmark
German Palatines
Ethnic groups in Denmark
German diaspora in Europe